Harper Road may refer to:

 Harper Road, London, a road in south London, England
 Harper Road, Singapore, a road in Singapore
 Prince Edward Island Route 158, officially known as Harper Road